Magnesioferrite is a magnesium iron oxide mineral, a member of the magnetite series of spinels. 
Magnesioferrite crystallizes as black metallic octahedral crystals. It is named after its chemical composition of magnesium and ferric iron.
The density is 4.6 - 4.7 (average = 4.65), and the diaphaniety is opaque. Occurs as well-formed fine sized crystals or massive and granular. 
Its hardness is  6-6.5. It has a metallic luster and a dark red streak.

Occurrence
It occurs in fumaroles, as a result of combustion metamorphism and coal seam fires, in glass spherules related to meteorite impacts, and as accessory phase in kimberlites and carbonatites.

It has been reported from Vesuvius and Stromboli, Italy.

References

Iron(III) minerals
Magnesium minerals
Spinel group
Cubic minerals
Minerals in space group 227